J00 may refer to:
 HMS Bangor (J00), a 1940 British Royal Navy minesweeper

and also:
 You, often written as joo or j00 in Leet
 J00: Acute nasopharyngitis (common cold or rhinitis) ICD-10 code